"Your Lying Blue Eyes" is a song written by Ken McDuffie, and recorded by American country music artist John Anderson.  It was released in October 1979 as the third single from the album John Anderson.  The song reached #15 on the Billboard Hot Country Singles & Tracks chart.

George Jones also recorded the song on his 1984 album You've Still Got a Place in My Heart.

Chart performance

References

1979 singles
John Anderson (musician) songs
George Jones songs
Song recordings produced by Norro Wilson
Warner Records Nashville singles
1979 songs